Maria Olivia Daytia-Prats (born October 20, 1981), better known by the screen name Isabel Oli, is a Filipina model and actress.

Background
Oli is the youngest of seven children to a Filipino father of Chinese descent and a Filipina mother of Spanish descent. She finished her secondary education at Cebu Eastern College and her tertiary education at the University of San Jose-Recoletos (Cebu) with a degree in Information Technology. She gained media attention in 2004 when she landed a role in a Max's Restaurant commercial.

In 2003, she started her acting career in ABS-CBN via It Might Be You and Maalaala Mo Kaya episode with Baron Geisler and her soon-to-be spouse John Prats, before moving to GMA Network in 2005.

It was her similarly named role of Isabel, the leading lady to matinee idol, Richard Gutierrez in Sugo, that launched her to full stardom. Her exposure on Sugo also landed her a role on the GMA Films' summer 2006 offering Moments of Love. Her face currently graces the covers of glossy magazines, billboards and print ads, and appears regularly on GMA Network shows. The latter portrayed the antagonistic Rosita, originally played by award-winning actress Lorna Tolentino, in Sine Novela: Maging Akin Ka Lamang. She then appeared in Gagambino, opposite Dennis Trillo.

In 2009, she played Iza Calzado's antagonist in her second Sine Novela, Kaya Kong Abutin Ang Langit. Oli also played the much-coveted role of Elaine in the Philippine Version of the Korean 2004 television series, Full House. Isabel Oli is part of the cast for the movie Rosario, an MMFF 2010 entry to be shown on December 25, 2010. In 2014, Oli returned to ABS-CBN to appear in the special finale participation as Chef Bernadette Cruz in Annaliza.

Personal life
On September 24, 2014, her long-time boyfriend, actor John Prats, organized a flash mob and proposed to her in Eastwood City.

On May 16, 2015, Prats and Oli married in Batangas. Their first child is a daughter.

On June 26, 2018 they announced the gender of their second baby in their Youtube channel (Pratty TV) and it is revealed to be a boy. He was born on November 25, 2018.

Filmography

Television

Movies

Awards

References

External links
Isabel Oli Pratts Instagram official account
Isabel Oli Pratts twitter official Acct

1981 births
Living people
Filipino film actresses
Filipino television actresses
Filipino Christians
Filipino evangelicals
Filipino Pentecostals
Filipino Protestants
Filipino female models
Filipino people of Chinese descent
Visayan people
Filipino people of Spanish descent
Actresses from Manila
People from Cebu City
Actresses from Cebu
University of San Jose–Recoletos alumni
Star Magic
ABS-CBN personalities
GMA Network personalities